Nicholas Michael Broeker (born October 7, 2000) is an American football offensive guard for the Ole Miss Rebels.

High school career
Broeker attended Sacred Heart-Griffin High School in Springfield, Illinois. As a senior, he was The State Journal-Registers 2019 Male Athlete of the Year. He committed to the University of Mississippi to play college football.

College career
Broeker played in all 12 games his true freshman year at Ole Miss in 2019. He started all 10 games at left tackle in 2020 and all 13 in 2021. As a senior in 2022, he switched from tackle to guard. That season, he was named the winner of the Kent Hull Trophy.

References

External links
Ole Miss Rebels bio

2000 births
Living people
Players of American football from Illinois
American football offensive guards
American football offensive tackles
Ole Miss Rebels football players